Greenhoff is a surname. Notable people with the surname include:

Brian Greenhoff (1953–2013), English footballer
Frank Greenhoff (1924–1999), English footballer
Jimmy Greenhoff (born 1946), English footballer

See also
Greenhough